SS Vandyck was a 1911 steam ocean liner operated by Lamport and Holt Line and used on its service between New York and the River Plate. The German cruiser  sank her in 1914.

Vandyck was named after the Flemish Baroque painter Anthony van Dyck (1599–1641). She was the second of three Lamport and Holt ships to bear the name. The first was an 1867 steamship that Lamport and Holt bought and renamed Vandyck in 1873. The third and last was a steam ocean liner built for Lamport and Holt in 1921, converted into an armed boarding vessel in World War II and sunk by enemy action in 1940.

Building
Vandyck was the first of three sister ships that Workman, Clark and Company of Belfast built for Lamport and Holt in 1911–13. Her yard number was 301. The trio were similar in size to  that Sir Raylton Dixon & Co built for Lamport and Holt in 1909. Vauban and Vestris had passenger accommodation slightly larger than that of Vandyck. Since 1906 Lamport and Holt policy was to name its passenger liners after artists and engineers beginning with "V". Together they became known as "V-class ships".

Workman, Clark launched Vandyck on 1 June 1911 and completed her on 8 September. Her twin screws were driven by a pair of four-cylinder quadruple-expansion engines.

Lamport and Holt registered Vandyck in Liverpool. Her UK official number was 131378 and her code letters were HTKF.

Service history
Vandyck, Vauban and Vestris were intended for Lamport and Holt's service between Liverpool and Buenos Aires via Vigo and Leixões and Lisbon. But in 1911 the Royal Mail Steam Packet Company had taken over Lamport and Holt. RMSP chartered Vauban for a new and quicker service between Southampton and the River Plate. For this Vauban was briefly renamed Alcala and repainted in RMSP colours. By the end of 1913 RMSP had returned Vauban to Lamport and Holt and restored her to her original name and colours. However, RMSP effectively forced L&H out of the route between Britain and the River Plate. Lamport and Holt then transferred Vandyck, Vauban and Vestris to strengthen its service between New York and the River Plate via Barbados and Trinidad, where they became the largest and most luxurious ships on the route.

By 1914 Vandyck was equipped for wireless telegraphy, operating on the 300 and 600 metre wavelengths. Her call sign was MJY.

In July 1914 World War I began, and on 26 October that year the German cruiser  intercepted Vandyck about 690 miles west by south of St Paul's Rocks. Vandyck was en route from Buenos Aires to New York carrying more than 200 passengers, most of whom were US citizens, and a cargo including more than 1,000 tons of frozen meat. Karlsruhes crew transferred Vandycks passengers and crew to the steamship Ascuncion, which took them to Pará in Brazil, where they landed on 1 November. Karlsruhe also took much of Vandycks cargo, particularly the frozen meat. On 27 October Karlsruhes crew sank Vandyck off the Brazilian state of Maranhão.

References

Bibliography

1911 ships
Maritime incidents in October 1914
Passenger ships of the United Kingdom
Ships of the Lamport and Holt Line
Steamships of the United Kingdom
World War I shipwrecks in the Atlantic Ocean